Pabalat is a form of papercutting originating in the province of Bulacan in the Philippines. It involves making intricate papercut designs from wrappers used in pastillas and laminated as bookmarks, and usually made from papel de japon (Japanese paper). Among the well-known practitioners of the craft are San Miguel residents Nene Luz Ocampo and her daughter, Naty Ocampo-Castro.

The origin of the art form is vague, but according to Luz Ocampo, the art form may have been derived from Chinese papercutting brought by Chinese merchants. The form may also have been an offshoot of papel picado from Mexico. There are also variations in pabalat making in Bulacan. In San Miguel, a stencil is used in tracing a pattern on the paper for pabalat-making, while in Malolos, a stencil is not used, preferring to create the design in a "free-form" and impromptu fashion.

References

Folk art
Paper art
Philippine art
Philippine handicrafts